Meramec Township is a township in St. Louis County, in the U.S. state of Missouri. Its population was 39,731 as of the 2010 census.

References

	

Townships in Missouri
Townships in St. Louis County, Missouri